Samuel Jones "Sam" Locklear III (born October 28, 1954) is a retired United States Navy admiral who last served as the commander of the United States Pacific Command from March 9, 2012, to May 27, 2015. Prior to that, he served as Commander, United States Naval Forces Europe – United States Naval Forces Africa and NATO's Commander, Allied Joint Force Command Naples. Prior to that, he served as Director, Navy Staff from July 2009 to October 2010. He retired from the navy on July 1, 2015, after 39 years of service.

Early life and education
Locklear enlisted in the United States Navy in March 1972 at the age of 17. His basic training and active service was placed on hold when he was accepted into the United States Naval Academy after graduating from James F Byrnes High School in 1972. Locklear graduated from the Naval Academy in 1977, where he earned a Bachelor of Science degree in operations analysis.

Naval career
After receiving his commission as an ensign, Locklear served aboard  as Main Propulsion Assistant and Missile Fire Control Officer. Subsequently, he commanded  and served as Commander, Destroyer Squadron 2 deploying with the  Battle Group. In October 2002, he assumed command of Cruiser-Destroyer Group 5 and Nimitz Strike Group deploying to the Persian Gulf in 2003 in direct support of Operation Iraqi Freedom and Operation Enduring Freedom.

Ashore, Locklear has served as a Company Officer in the Office of the Commandant, United States Naval Academy and later as the 78th Commandant of Midshipmen. In Washington, D.C., he served as Chief of the Regional Engagement and Presence Joint Warfare Capabilities Assessment Branch in the Strategic Plans and Policy Directorate of the Joint Chiefs of Staff, as Executive Assistant to the Vice Chief of Naval Operations, and as Deputy Director for Requirements in the Assessment Division (N81D). In February 2004, he returned to the OPNAV Staff as Deputy Director for Surface Warfare (N76B), and in October 2004, he became the Director of the Assessment Division (N81). In October 2005 he became the Director of the Programming Division (N80). From May 2007 to July 2009, he served as Commander, United States Third Fleet and, from July 2009, as Director, Navy Staff (N09B).

Locklear is a 1992 graduate of the National Defense University's Industrial College of the Armed Forces, holds a Master of Public Administration degree from the George Washington University, and attended the Senior Officials in National Security course at the Maxwell School of Syracuse University.

Locklear's personal decorations include the Navy Distinguished Service Medal with gold star, Defense Superior Service Medal, Legion of Merit with four gold stars, Bronze Star Medal, Navy Meritorious Service Medal with three gold stars, Navy Commendation Medal with gold star, Navy Achievement Medal with gold star, and numerous unit and campaign awards.

In March 2011, Locklear commanded United States Navy forces enforcing the Libyan no-fly zone, with overall command going to General Carter Ham.

Locklear has called climate change (global warming) the biggest worry for the United States. On April 9, 2013, Jim Inhofe, the ranking member of the Senate Committee on Armed Services, asked Locklear to clarify his position of climate change as the principal national security threat. Locklear cited USAID government statistics on recent Indo-Asian natural disasters and the long range planning challenges of our security partners and allies in the region.

In 2015, Leonard Glenn Francis, the contractor at the center of the "Fat Leonard" navy corruption scandal, told Navy investigators that he paid for "opulent dinners and other favors" for Locklear, including procuring a prostitute. Although the navy cleared Locklear of wrongdoing, the episode prevented his appointment to Chairman of the Joint Chiefs of Staff, for which he had been shortlisted. Locklear retired from the navy in June 2015, a month after Joseph Dunford was appointed chairman instead.

Awards and decorations

References

External links

Official biography  This work is in the public domain.

Living people
United States Navy admirals
United States Naval Academy alumni
Recipients of the Legion of Merit
People of the First Libyan Civil War
1954 births
Recipients of the Defense Superior Service Medal
Recipients of the Defense Distinguished Service Medal
Recipients of the Navy Distinguished Service Medal
Honorary Officers of the Order of Australia
21st-century American naval officers
20th-century American naval officers